The Rybakov Foundation is a private philanthropic organization, founded by Ekaterina Rybakova and Igor Rybakov in 2015. It has a number of national and international projects and is best known globally for the Rybakov Prize, an award for philanthropists in education.

History 
Rybakov Foundation was established by the Russian billionaire Igor Rybakov and his wife Ekaterina in December 2015. Rybakov applied the concepts of efficient business management to charity and educational projects.

In 2016, the founders identified three areas of work: development of education, entrepreneurship, and non-commercial sector. The Foundation also sponsored an annual #EdCrunch conference for new technologies in education.

In 2017, the foundation partnered with the Moscow City University, Projectoria NGO and the World Bank to launch Collab Challenge, a Scratch coding contest for Russian teenagers. Also in May 2017, the foundation and Higher School of Economics launched first PhilTech (Technologies for Philanthropy) business accelerator in Russia.

From 2015 to 2018, Ekaterina Rybakova and Igor Rybakov invested 1 billion rubles in Rybakov Foundation. In March 2019, they announced that they were investing another 1 billion rubles in the Foundation.

In March 2019, at a press conference in Moscow, Ekaterina Rybakova and Igor Rybakov presented “School as the center of society” concept, focused on socio-educational development in line with the United Nations' Sustainable Development Goal 4. They also announced the launch of The Rybakov Prize, an initiative supported by UNESCO Institute for Information Technologies in Education and the World Bank.

In February 2020, during the first Rybakov Prize ceremony, the founders has committed to spending $100 million over the next 10 years on the development of education. During the COVID-19 pandemic Rybakov Foundation provided Laptops to the multi-child families. 232 multi-child families received laptops from different regions.

Major projects

School education 
In 2016, Rybakov Foundation launched the #iTeacher annual all-Russian competition for educational innovators. The following year it launched “TOP School”, an all-Russian competition of school projects. In September 2019, the foundation merged two competitions into Rybakov School Award. In 2019, the award had 2,846 applications, 50 individual winners and 20 team (schools) winners.

Preschool education 
In November 2016, Rybakov Foundation launched Rybakov Preschool Award, an annual award named after a prominent Soviet psychologist Lev Vygotsky, to support preschool education projects and individual educators. It is also known for its Summer School, an intensive professional development program for the competition's winners. The total award pool is 30 million rubles ($375,991).

Rybakov Prize 
The Rybakov Prize was announced in March 2019. It is an annual award totaling $1.2 million, which is awarded to 3 philanthropists in education. Grand prix winner receives $1 million, while the other 2 winners earn $100,000 each.

In 2019, The Rybakov Prize considered 460 applications from more than 40 countries. A nine-person jury committee included Harry Patrinos (World Bank Education), Vikas Pota (Varkey Foundation), Osama Obeidat (Queen Rania Teacher Academy), Safeena Husain (Educate Girls), Steven Duggan (UNESCO Institute for Information Technologies in Education, Terawe Corporation), Randall Lane (Forbes USA), Tatyana Bakalchuk (Wildberries), Magomed Musaev (Global Venture Alliance) и Sergey Solonin (Qiwi). The winners were Abdul Abdulkerimov of Luminary Center (Grand Prix), Olga Zubkova of Tetradka Druzhby National Association for the Development of Education, and Boris Bulayev of Educate!.

Recognition
In 2016 the foundation was among top 9 non-profit organizations in Russia, according to Ogoniok magazine. In 2019 and 2020 it was among top 20 private non-profit organizations in Russia, according to Forbes Russia. In 2020, the Foundation ranked third in the list of private charity organizations in Russia, according to RAEX rating agency.

International partnerships
Rybakov Foundation is a member of the European Venture Philanthropy Association (EVPA), and the Asian Venture Philanthropy Network (AVPN).

Bibliography

References 

Foundations based in Russia
Charities based in Russia